Ilyas Rashidi was a Pakistani publisher and editor who founded Nigar (magazine), dedicated exclusively to films and film personalities, in 1948 and the historic and prestigious Nigar Awards on 17 July 1957.

The Ilyas Rashidi Lifetime Achievement Gold Medal is presented annually at the Nigar Awards ceremony and event. In January 2017, a press conference was held at a local hotel in Karachi to announce the scheduled date of 16 March 2017 for the 47th Nigar Awards.

Death and legacy
Ilyas Rashidi died in 1997. He was also affectionately called Baba-e-Filmi Sahafat (Pioneer of Film Journalism) in Pakistan. His son, Aslam Ilyas Rashidi temporarily suspended the annual awarding of Nigar Awards from 2005 to 2012 due to a then ongoing decline in Pakistani film industry during that period. In 2012, Aslam Ilyas Rashidi announced plans to revive the Nigar Awards for films and stated that this time it would also include awards for the Pakistani television industry.

References

1997 deaths
Pakistani magazine founders
Pakistani publishers (people)
Pakistani magazine editors
People from Karachi
Journalists from Sindh
Pakistani male journalists
Year of birth missing